Bookworm is a general name for any insect that is said to bore through books.

The damage to books that is commonly attributed to "bookworms" is often caused by the larvae of various types of insects including beetles, moths and cockroaches, which may bore or chew through books seeking food. The damage is not caused by any species of worm. Some such larvae exhibit a superficial resemblance to worms and are the likely inspiration for the term, though they are not true worms. In other cases, termites, carpenter ants, and woodboring beetles will first infest wooden bookshelves and later feed on books placed upon the shelves, attracted by the wood-pulp paper used in most commercial book production.

True book-borers are uncommon. The primary food sources for many "bookworms" are the leather or cloth bindings of a book, the glue used in the binding process, or molds and fungi that grow on or inside books. When the pages themselves are attacked, a gradual encroachment across the surface of one page or a small number of pages is typical, rather than the boring of holes through the entire book.

The term has come to have a second, idiomatic use, indicative of a person who reads a great deal or to perceived excess: someone who devours books metaphorically.

Booklice 

The booklouse, also known as a paperlouse, is a soft-bodied, wingless insect in the order Psocoptera (usually Trogium pulsatorium), typically 1 mm or less in length. Booklice feed on microscopic molds and other organic matter found in or on aging items that have been stored in places that lack the climate control necessary to inhibit organic growth. Areas of archives, libraries, and museums that are cool, damp, dark, and generally undisturbed are common sites for such growth, generating a food source which subsequently attracts booklice. Booklice will also attack bindings, glue, and paper.

Despite their name, booklice are not considered to be true lice, as they do not feed on a living host.

By the 20th century, bookbinding materials had developed a high resistance against damage by various types of book-boring insects. Many museums and archives in possession of materials vulnerable to booklouse damage employ pest control methods to manage existing infestations and make use of climate control to prevent the growth of potential booklouse food sources.

Other book-eating insects

Beetles
Of the quarter million species of beetles, some adults damage books by eating paper and binding materials themselves.  However, their larvae do the most damage. Typically eggs are laid on the book's edges and spine.  Upon hatching, they bore into, and sometimes even through, the book.

Woodboring beetles
Common furniture beetle
Deathwatch beetle
The genus Gastrallus
Indian bookworm beetle
Australian spider beetle
Cigarette beetle
Drugstore beetle

Auger beetles
Lesser grain borer

Long horned beetles
House longhorn beetle

Bark beetles
Flat bark beetle
Merchant beetle
Sawtoothed grain beetle

True weevils
Rice weevil
Wheat weevil

Skin beetles
These beetles have been known to feed on leather bindings.
Furniture carpet beetle
Museum beetle
Common carpet beetle
Varied carpet beetle
Fur beetle
Black carpet beetle
Dermestes coarctatus
Larder beetle 
Dermestes maculatus
Dermestes vorax
Khapra beetle
Reesa
Trogoderma versicolor
Odd beetle

Powderpost beetles
African powderpost beetle
Brown powderpost beetle 
Black powderpost beetle

Darkling beetles
Confused flour beetle
Destructive flour beetle
Dark mealworm beetle
Mealworm
Red flour beetle

Termites
Termites are the most devastating type of book eating pest. They will eat almost every part of a book including paper, cloth, and cardboard, not to mention the damage that can be done to shelves. Termites can make entire collections unusable before the infestation is even noticed.
Powderpost termite
Western drywood termite

Ants
Some species of ants can damage books in a way that is similar to termites.
Black carpenter ant
Camponotus obscuripes
Hercules ant

Moths
Moths that feed on cloth will also feed on bookbindings, decaying organic material (which includes paper), and mold.

Fungus moths
Carpet moth
Case-bearing clothes moth
Clothing moth

Pyralid moths
Mediterranean flour moth
Indianmeal moth
Warehouse moth

Concealer moths
brown house moth

Cockroaches
Bookdamaging cockroach species chew away at the starch in cloth bindings and paper. Their droppings can also harm books.

Wood cockroaches
German cockroach

Household cockroaches
American cockroach
Oriental cockroach
Smokybrown cockroach
Australian cockroach

Zygentoma
These insects consume portions of books that contain polysaccharides. Paper that is slightly ragged at the edges is usually the work of silverfish.

Lepismatidae
Firebrat
Silverfish

Management
Pesticides can be used to protect books from these insects, but they are often made with harsh chemicals that make them an unattractive option. Museums and universities that want to keep their archives bookworm free without using pesticides often turn towards temperature control. Books can be stored at low temperatures that keep eggs from hatching, or placed in a deep-freezer to kill larvae and adults. The idea was taken from commercial food storage practices, as they are often dealing with the same pests.
 Pseudoscorpions such as Chelifer cancroides may live in books and feed on book-eating insects, controlling their numbers.

Idiom
The term is also used idiomatically to describe an avid or voracious reader, or a bibliophile. In its earliest iterations, it had a negative connotation, referring to someone who would rather read than participate in the world around them. Over the years its meaning has drifted in a more positive direction.

See also
Bibliomania
Book collecting
Tsundoku

References

Citations

Further reading 

"John Francis Xavier O'Conor, Facts about bookworms: their history in literature and work in libraries (New York: Francis P. Harper, 1898.)
Dr. John V. Richardson Jr., PhD."Bookworms: The Most Common Insect Pests of Paper in Archives, Libraries, and Museums".
"Timber Borers – Anobium & Lyctus Borers"
"Study on integrated pest management for libraries and archives" – prepared by Thomas A Parker for the General Information Programme and UNISIST (Paris: Unesco, 1988)

Book terminology
Books
Insect common names
Pest insects